Brachinus berytensis is a species of ground beetle in the Brachininae subfamily that can be found in Bulgaria, Cyprus, and Greece. It can also be found in the Near Eastern countries such as Armenia, Turkey (more precisely, Asia Minor), Israel, Lebanon, and Syria. The species look similar to Brachinus bombarda.

References

Beetles described in 1855
Beetles of Asia
Beetles of Europe
Brachininae